The 2007 Skate Canada International was the second event of six in the 2007–08 ISU Grand Prix of Figure Skating, a senior-level international invitational competition series. It was held at the Colisée Pepsi in Quebec City, Quebec on November 1–4. Medals were awarded in the disciplines of men's singles, ladies' singles, pair skating, and ice dancing. Skaters earned points toward qualifying for the 2007–08 Grand Prix Final.

Results

Men
France's Brian Joubert won the men's title ahead of Belgium's Kevin van der Perren. Jeffrey Buttle of Canada took the bronze.

Ladies
Mao Asada of Japan won the ladies' title ahead of her compatriot Yukari Nakano and Canada's Joannie Rochette. Nakano landed a triple axel in her free skating.

Pairs
Germany's Aliona Savchenko / Robin Szolkowy won the pairs' title. Russia's Yuko Kawaguchi / Alexander Smirnov attempted a throw quadruple salchow jump in their free skating. They were credited with the rotation, but she fell on the landing, so it was not completed successfully.

Ice dancing
Canada's Tessa Virtue / Scott Moir won gold in ice dancing. Melissa Gregory / Denis Petukhov of the United States withdrew before the free dance due to an accident; he lost his footing and dropped her on her chest while performing a one-handed rotational lift during the six-minute warmup, and skidded into the boards himself. Gregory was rushed to a hospital on a stretcher but released later that night. They missed the rest of the competitive season while recovering from their injuries. The compulsory dance was the Yankee Polka.

Hann-McCurdy and Coreno were substitutes, replacing a team which withdrew before the start of the event.

References

External links
 Official site
 Starting orders and results
 2007 Skate Canada International at ISU

Skate Canada International, 2007
Skate Canada International
2007 in Canadian sports 
2007 in Quebec